"Ain't Understanding Mellow" is  a song written by Homer Talbert and Herscholt Polk and performed by Jerry Butler and Brenda Lee Eager.  The song was arranged by James Mack and produced by Gerald Sims and Jerry Butler. It was featured on Butler's 1971 album The Sagittarius Movement.

Chart performance
It reached #3 on the U.S. R&B chart and #21 on the U.S. pop chart in 1972.  The song ranked #84 on Billboard magazine's Top 100 singles of 1972.

Certifications
"Ain't Understanding Mellow" was the second of two singles which were gold certified by the RIAA for Butler, selling over a million copies.  The first was "Only the Strong Survive" in 1969.

Sampling
The song was sampled in 2002 by Angie Stone for the song Bring Your Heart featured on the Brown Sugar
The song was sampled in the 2012 song "4EvaNaDay (Theme)" by Big K.R.I.T. on his album 4eva N a Day.

References

1971 songs
1971 singles
Jerry Butler songs
Mercury Records singles